Clivedon Hall was an estate located along the shore of the Potomac River in Charles County, Maryland. It stands along the outskirts of the residential community known as "Clifton on the Potomack".

Col. John Fendall I (1672-1734) purchased “Clivedon Hall” or “Clifdon Hall” in 1721 and made it his dwelling estate.

In 1784, when John's grandson Philip Richard Fendall I, Esq. (1734-1805) placed an ad in the newspaper to sell the estate, the property included: “a large elegant brick Dwelling House completely finished, a brick kitchen and dairy, a large stable with a hay loft, storehouse, warehouse, granary, barn, corn houses, and a variety of other convenient buildings...beautiful healthy situation that commands an extensive view up and down the river”.

Upon John's death the inventory of his personalty refers to both a dwelling house and a kitchen, as well as household furnishings far too numerous to be accommodated by a building of the present Clifton's size. The largest remaining remnant of a building is believed to be the kitchen dependency, which collapsed in 1972. A small storage closet next to the fireplace contained a ladder leading to an unfinished attic. The building included an unusual off-centered chimney stack. All that is left of this structure as of 1995 was the base bricks, and a rotting clapboard roof.

Whether this structure was built by John's son Benjamin or grandson Philip, it can be said that “Clivedon Hall” was the earliest surviving domestic dependency of its type in Charles County.  The distinctive architecture of this kitchen outbuilding suggests that the Fendall home may have been one of the County's more distinguished eighteenth-century residences.  Back in the early 1970s it was believed that the house was originally owned by John's father, Gov. Josias Fendall (ca. 1628-1687), and plans were made to restore the buildings.  However an extensive study was done on the area, and came to prove that the colorful Governor did not own or live at “Clivedon”.  As a result, all attempts to preserve the site were scrapped, and the buildings became further dilapidated.  All that remains is several standing barn sites, some of which were probably built after the Fendalls owned the land, and other brick structures that have since crumpled into ruins.

John conveyed most of his plantation and other lands, several years before his death, to his son Benjamin Fendall I, Esq. (1708-1764).  Benjamin maintained the property as his own dwelling estate, as well as owning a profitable bake house and store at nearby Allen's Fresh, and two mills built there by John Allen in 1674.  Benjamin married Eleanor Lee (1710-1759), of “Blenheim”, which was a contiguous estate owned by her father Capt. Philip Lee, Sr., Hon., Esq. (1681-1744).  Benjamin died in 1764, requesting that he be interred in “my burying place in my garden by my dear and well beloved first wife and those of my children which it has pleased the Almighty to take from me”.  He left an estate which included 30 slaves, two servants, and a large and well-furnished dwelling house with at least six fireplaces and a separate kitchen.  The bulk of Benjamin's real and personal property was sold between 1764 and 1766 to settle his estate.  The most valuable lands and household furnishings were purchased by his son Philip Richard Fendall I, Esq. (1734-1805), to whom Benjamin had previously made a gift of the principal part of the plantation.

In 1787, Philip conveyed the entire property to his brother-in-law, Benjamin Gwinn. In 1798 the house was occupied by Capt., Rev. Benjamin Contee, Hon. (1755-1815), and the county tax assessments gave a value of $1,700 to it, placing its value at about equal to “Marshall Hall”. Mr. Contee was a grandson of Benjamin Fendall I, Esq. “Of Potomac”. The next owner, Johannes D. Storke (d. 1845) purchased the property in 1839, which at that time included , and four years later purchased another  of the same tract. In 1854 the property was purchased by Rhoderick Watson (d. 1862), who operated a key Confederate signal post to Confederates on the Virginia shores from the estate during the early part of the Civil War.

References

Landmarks in Maryland
Houses in Charles County, Maryland
Fendall family
Contee family
Houses completed in the 18th century